The Dan River flows  in the U.S. states of North Carolina and Virginia.  It rises in Patrick County, Virginia, and crosses the state border into Stokes County, North Carolina.  It then flows into Rockingham County. From there it flows back into Virginia through Pittsylvania County before reentering North Carolina near the border between Caswell County and Rockingham County. It flows into northern Caswell County and then back into southern Virginia (briefly Pittsylvania County, then into Halifax County) and finally into Kerr Reservoir on the Roanoke River.

The name of the river was first recorded by William Byrd II in 1728, during an expedition to survey the Virginia border, though Byrd did not explain the reason for the name.  A variant name is "South Branch Roanoke River".

In 2014, a large amount of coal ash, a byproduct of coal combustion, spilled into the river, prompting a cleanup process costing an estimated $300 million.

Dan River is also the name of the southeastern political district of Pittsylvania County, where a small section of the river serves as the boundary between Pittsylvania County and the city of Danville.

On June 25, 2021, the North Carolina General Assembly passed a law adding the river's paddle trail in Stokes and Rockingham Counties as its eleventh State Trail.

See also
List of rivers of North Carolina
List of rivers of Virginia

References

External links

Dan River State Trail, official website for the state paddle trail.
Map of the Dan River Watershed

Rivers of Caswell County, North Carolina
Rivers of Rockingham County, North Carolina
Rivers of Stokes County, North Carolina
Rivers of Patrick County, Virginia
Rivers of North Carolina
Rivers of Virginia
Tributaries of the Roanoke River